Ectoedemia pilosae is a moth of the family Nepticulidae. It was described by Puplesis in 1984. It is known from the Russian Far East.

The larvae feed on Agrimonia pilosa.

References

Nepticulidae
Moths of Asia
Moths described in 1984